Emma Turner may refer to:

 Emma Louisa Turner (1866–1940), British ornithologist and bird photographer
 a pseudonym for Martha Tabram (1849–1888), murdered English prostitute